Peter Willmott may refer to:

 Peter Willmott (sociologist) (1923–2000), British sociologist 
 Peter Willmott (businessman), American businessman